Clinches Pond is a small lake in Moorebank, New South Wales, Australia. It is surrounded by a park called Clinches Pond Reserve.

References

Lakes of New South Wales